The Mighty McGurk is a 1947 American sports, drama, action, adventure, melodrama film starring Wallace Beery as a boozing ex-boxer brawling as a bouncer in a Bowery saloon.

Plot
Roy "Slag" McGurk (Wallace Beery), the former heavyweight boxing champion, ekes out a living as a bouncer in Mike Glenson's (Edward Arnold) saloon in the rough Bowery district of New York City. Mike has to meet two brewers for an important deal, so he sends Slag to pick up his daughter Caroline (Dorothy Patrick), returning by ship from Europe. Despite his estrangement from Johnny Burden (Cameron Mitchell), his boxing protege who joined the Salvation Army after putting one opponent in a wheelchair, Slag tells the young man that Mike sent Caroline away to try to break up her relationship with Johnny.

At Ellis Island, an acquaintance offers to pay Slag to round up 50 new immigrants to work for him. The fiftieth man has a young English boy in tow, Nipper (Dean Stockwell), an orphan who has been sent to America to live with his uncle Milbane (Aubrey Mather). Slag reluctantly agrees to deliver the boy, who would rather stay with him than go to his uncle. When rival work recruiters start a fight, Nipper either loses or throws away the tag bearing Milbane's address. After searching for the uncle, Slag has no choice but to keep the boy and a stray dog Nipper saved from the dogcatchers.

In order to complete his deal with the brewers and build the biggest saloon in the Bowery, Mike needs the building occupied by the Salvation Army. He orders Slag to get the group to leave, one way or another. When Slag refuses, Mike blackmails him into it, stating he has evidence that Slag won his championship by fraud; his opponent took a dive. To placate his employee, Mike offers to make Slag a partner in his new saloon for $2000, a sum Slag hopes to get as a reward from Nipper's uncle.

Meanwhile, the Children's Protective Society learns about Nipper. The only way Slag can keep the boy is to join the Salvation Army, under Johnny's command.

When he finally does locate Milbane, he discovers that Nipper's relation is a crook who wants him to give him money for some shares. Nipper learns, from their loud argument, that Slag was only interested in the reward. The brokenhearted boy goes to stay with the Salvation Army. When word gets around, Slag loses the friendship of former girlfriend and pawnshop owner Mamie Steeple (Aline MacMahon), who had been loaning him money for years.

When Mike pressures Slag to arrange a riot at the Salvation Army, Slag finally rebels. He tells the saloon patrons that his championship bout was rigged, then fights all the thugs he himself had recruited for Mike. Johnny joins in the brawl, and together they beat the mob arrayed against them. Caroline finds out what her father had tried to do, and goes to pack her things. Mike gives up, and tells Johnny to go after her. With the way clear to adopting Nipper, Slag asks Mamie for a loan of $200 ... to pay for a wedding.

Cast

Wallace Beery as Roy "Slag" McGurk
Dean Stockwell as Nipper
Edward Arnold as Mike Glenson
Aline MacMahon as Mamie Steeple
Cameron Mitchell as Johnny Burden
Dorothy Patrick as Caroline Glenson
Aubrey Mather as Milbane
Morris Ankrum as Fowles, one of Milbane's crooked associates
Clinton Sundberg as Flexter, Milbane's other associate
Charles Judels as First Brewer
Torben Meyer as Second Brewer
Joe Yule as Irish Immigrant (uncredited)

Production
The picture bears some similarities to Beery's 1933 film The Bowery, the Raoul Walsh-directed blockbuster also starring George Raft, Jackie Cooper and Fay Wray.

Reception
The critic for The New York Times found The Mighty McGurk to be too much like Beery's previous efforts, writing, "while this story of an ex-prizefight champ who befriends an English orphan boy fits our pug as comfortably as an old shoe, it doesn't look much better than an ancient brogan. Mr. Beery, in short, has fought this good fight before and chances are the going will be as familiar and slow for the customers as it seems to be for our hero."

According to MGM records, the film earned $1,397,000 in the US and Canada and $402,000 elsewhere resulting in a profit of $314,000.

References

External links

1947 drama films
1947 films
American drama films
American black-and-white films
Films about orphans
Films directed by John Waters (director born 1893)
Films set in New York City
Metro-Goldwyn-Mayer films
1940s English-language films
1940s American films